Doxa Nea Manolada F.C. is a Greek football club, based in Nea Manolada, Elis.

The club was founded in 1959. They will play for 2nd season in Football League 2 for the season 2014-15.

Elis
Football clubs in Western Greece

The club during the 2020-2021 season is playing at a non-professional tier